The Road To Lichfield is the first novel for adults by Penelope Lively, published in 1977. It made the short-list for the Booker Prize. It was rereleased by Penguin Essentials in 2017.

References

1977 British novels
Novels by Penelope Lively
Heinemann (publisher) books
Lichfield
Novels set in Staffordshire